Type 2 diabetes, formerly known as adult-onset diabetes, is a form of diabetes mellitus that is characterized by high blood sugar, insulin resistance, and relative lack of insulin. Common symptoms include increased thirst, frequent urination, and unexplained weight loss. Symptoms may also include increased hunger, feeling tired, and sores (wounds) that do not heal. Often symptoms come on slowly. Long-term complications from high blood sugar include heart disease, strokes, diabetic retinopathy which can result in blindness, kidney failure, and poor blood flow in the limbs which may lead to amputations. The sudden onset of hyperosmolar hyperglycemic state may occur; however, ketoacidosis is uncommon.

Type 2 diabetes primarily occurs as a result of obesity and lack of exercise. Some people are genetically more at risk than others.

Type 2 diabetes makes up about 90% of cases of diabetes, with the other 10% due primarily to type 1 diabetes and gestational diabetes. In type 1 diabetes there is a lower total level of insulin to control blood glucose, due to an autoimmune induced loss of insulin-producing beta cells in the pancreas. Diagnosis of diabetes is by blood tests such as fasting plasma glucose, oral glucose tolerance test, or glycated hemoglobin (A1C).

Type 2 diabetes is largely preventable by staying a normal weight, exercising regularly, and eating a healthy diet (high in fruits and vegetables and low in sugar and saturated fats). Treatment involves exercise and dietary changes. If blood sugar levels are not adequately lowered, the medication metformin is typically recommended. Many people may eventually also require insulin injections. In those on insulin, routinely checking blood sugar levels is advised; however, this may not be needed in those who are not on insulin therapy. Bariatric surgery often improves diabetes in those who are obese.

Rates of type 2 diabetes have increased markedly since 1960 in parallel with obesity. As of 2015 there were approximately 392 million people diagnosed with the disease compared to around 30 million in 1985. Typically it begins in middle or older age, although rates of type 2 diabetes are increasing in young people. Type 2 diabetes is associated with a ten-year-shorter life expectancy. Diabetes was one of the first diseases ever described, dating back to an Egyptian manuscript from  BCE. The importance of insulin in the disease was determined in the 1920s.

Signs and symptoms

The classic symptoms of diabetes are frequent urination (polyuria), increased thirst (polydipsia), increased hunger (polyphagia), and weight loss. Other symptoms that are commonly present at diagnosis include a history of blurred vision, itchiness, peripheral neuropathy, recurrent vaginal infections, and fatigue. Other symptoms may include loss of taste.  Many people, however, have no symptoms during the first few years and are diagnosed on routine testing. A small number of people with type 2 diabetes can develop a hyperosmolar hyperglycemic state (a condition of very high blood sugar associated with a decreased level of consciousness and low blood pressure).

Complications

Type 2 diabetes is typically a chronic disease associated with a ten-year-shorter life expectancy. This is partly due to a number of complications with which it is associated, including: two to four times the risk of cardiovascular disease, including ischemic heart disease and stroke; a 20-fold increase in lower limb amputations, and increased rates of hospitalizations. In the developed world, and increasingly elsewhere, type 2 diabetes is the largest cause of nontraumatic blindness and kidney failure. It has also been associated with an increased risk of cognitive dysfunction and dementia through disease processes such as Alzheimer's disease and vascular dementia. Other complications include hyperpigmentation of skin (acanthosis nigricans), sexual dysfunction, and frequent infections. There is also an association between type 2 diabetes and mild hearing loss.

Causes
The development of type 2 diabetes is caused by a combination of lifestyle and genetic factors. While some of these factors are under personal control, such as diet and obesity, other factors are not, such as increasing age, female sex, and genetics. Obesity is more common in women than men in many parts of Africa. The nutritional status of a mother during fetal development may also play a role, with one proposed mechanism being that of DNA methylation. The intestinal bacteria Prevotella copri and Bacteroides vulgatus have been connected with type 2 diabetes.

Lifestyle

Lifestyle factors are important to the development of type 2 diabetes, including obesity and being overweight (defined by a body mass index of greater than 25), lack of physical activity, poor diet, psychological stress, and urbanization. Excess body fat is associated with 30% of cases in those of Chinese and Japanese descent, 60–80% of cases in those of European and African descent, and 100% of cases in Pima Indians and Pacific Islanders. Among those who are not obese, a high waist–hip ratio is often present. Smoking appears to increase the risk of type 2 diabetes.  A lack of sleep has also been linked to type 2 diabetes. Laboratory studies have linked short-term sleep deprivations to changes in glucose metabolism, nervous system activity, or hormonal factors that may lead to diabetes.

Dietary factors also influence the risk of developing type 2 diabetes. Consumption of sugar-sweetened drinks in excess is associated with an increased risk. The type of fats in the diet are important, with saturated fats and trans fatty acids increasing the risk, and polyunsaturated and monounsaturated fat decreasing the risk. Eating a lot of white rice appears to play a role in increasing risk. A lack of exercise is believed to cause 7% of cases. Persistent organic pollutants may also play a role.

Genetics

Most cases of diabetes involve many genes, with each being a small contributor to an increased probability of becoming a type 2 diabetic. The proportion of diabetes that is inherited is estimated at 72%. More than 36 genes and 80 single nucleotide polymorphisms (SNPs) had been found that contribute to the risk of type 2 diabetes. All of these genes together still only account for 10% of the total heritable component of the disease. The TCF7L2 allele, for example, increases the risk of developing diabetes by 1.5 times and is the greatest risk of the common genetic variants. Most of the genes linked to diabetes are involved in pancreatic beta cell functions.

There are a number of rare cases of diabetes that arise due to an abnormality in a single gene (known as monogenic forms of diabetes or "other specific types of diabetes"). These include maturity onset diabetes of the young (MODY), Donohue syndrome, and Rabson–Mendenhall syndrome, among others. Maturity onset diabetes of the young constitute 1–5% of all cases of diabetes in young people.

Epigenetics

Epigenetic regulation occurs at multiple levels including (1) direct methylation of cytosine and adenine residues in DNA, (2) covalent modification of histone proteins in chromatin, and (3) action of non coding microRNAs (for other examples, see Wikipedia article “Epigenetics”).  On November 17-19, 2017, the American Diabetes Association held a research symposium entitled “Epigenetics and Epigenomics: Implications for Diabetes and Obesity.”  As a result of this symposium, an overview of the state of the field was presented in which it was noted that over 1,000 research articles have been published that address the intersection of diabetes and epigenetics or epigenomics.  The current state of knowledge in this field is addressed the Wikipedia article “Epigenetics of diabetes Type 2.”

Medical conditions
There are a number of medications and other health problems that can predispose to diabetes. Some of the medications include: glucocorticoids, thiazides, beta blockers, atypical antipsychotics, and statins. Those who have previously had gestational diabetes are at a higher risk of developing type 2 diabetes. Other health problems that are associated include: acromegaly, Cushing's syndrome, hyperthyroidism, pheochromocytoma, and certain cancers such as glucagonomas. Individuals with cancer may be at a higher risk of mortality if they also have diabetes. Testosterone deficiency is also associated with type 2 diabetes. Eating disorders may also interact with type 2 diabetes, with bulimia nervosa increasing the risk and anorexia nervosa decreasing it.

Pathophysiology
Type 2 diabetes is due to insufficient insulin production from beta cells in the setting of insulin resistance. Insulin resistance, which is the inability of cells to respond adequately to normal levels of insulin, occurs primarily within the muscles, liver, and fat tissue. In the liver, insulin normally suppresses glucose release. However, in the setting of insulin resistance, the liver inappropriately releases glucose into the blood. The proportion of insulin resistance versus beta cell dysfunction differs among individuals, with some having primarily insulin resistance and only a minor defect in insulin secretion and others with slight insulin resistance and primarily a lack of insulin secretion.

Other potentially important mechanisms associated with type 2 diabetes and insulin resistance include: increased breakdown of lipids within fat cells, resistance to and lack of incretin, high glucagon levels in the blood, increased retention of salt and water by the kidneys, and inappropriate regulation of metabolism by the central nervous system. However, not all people with insulin resistance develop diabetes since an impairment of insulin secretion by pancreatic beta cells is also required.

In the early stages of insulin resistance, the mass of beta cells expands, increasing the output of insulin to compensate for the insulin insensitivity. But when type 2 diabetes has become manifest, a type 2 diabetic will have lost about half of their beta cells.
Fatty acids in the beta cells activate FOXO1, resulting in apoptosis of the beta cells.

The causes of the aging-related insulin resistance seen in obesity and in type 2 diabetes are uncertain. Effects of intracellular lipid metabolism and ATP production in liver and muscle cells may contribute to insulin resistance.  New evidence also points to a role of a brain region called the hypothalamus in the development of insulin resistance. For one thing, a gene called Dusp8 is linked with an increased risk for diabetes. This gene codes for a protein that regulates neuronal signaling in the hypothalamus. Also, infusions into the hypothalamus of a hormone called leptin normalize blood glucose and diminish insulin resistance in diabetic animals. Activation of hypothalamic cells by leptin has an important role in maintaining normal levels of blood glucose. Thus, both the endocrine cells of the pancreas AND cells in the hypothalamus may have a role in the etiology of type 2 diabetes.

Hypothalamic cells regulate blood glucose via projections to the autonomic nervous system. Autonomic innervation of liver and muscle cells stimulates an increased uptake of glucose. In diabetic humans, the control of blood glucose by the autonomic nervous system is abnormal. Leptin-sensitive, glucose regulating neurons become resistant to leptin during aging or during exposure to a high-fat diet. These leptin resistant neurons fail to restrain food intake, obesity, and blood glucose. The reasons for this lowered responsiveness to leptin are uncertain and are part of the puzzle of the causes of type 2 diabetes.

Blood glucose levels can also be normalized in diabetic rodents by a single intrahypothalamic infusion of Fibroblast Growth Factor 1 (FGF1), an effect that persists for months even in severely diabetic animals. This remarkable cure of diabetes is accomplished by a stimulation of accessory brain cells called astrocytes.  Hypothalamic astrocytes that produce Fatty Acid Binding Protein 7 (FABP7) are targets of FGF1; these cells are also in close contact with leptin-sensitive neurons, influence their function, and regulate leptin sensitivity. An abnormal function of FABP7+ astrocytes thus may contribute to the resistance to leptin and insulin that appear during aging and during exposure to high-fat diets.

During aging, FABP7+ astrocytes develop cytoplasmic granules derived from degenerating mitochondria. This mitochondrial degeneration is partly due to the oxidative stress of the heightened amounts of fatty acids that are taken up by these cells and oxidized within mitochondria.  A pathological degeneration of mitochondria in these cells may compromise their normal functions and contribute to abnormalities in the control of blood glucose by the hypothalamus.

Diagnosis

The World Health Organization definition of diabetes (both type 1 and type 2) is for a single raised glucose reading with symptoms, otherwise raised values on two occasions, of either:
 fasting plasma glucose ≥ 7.0 mmol/L (126 mg/dL)
or
 with a glucose tolerance test, two hours after the oral dose a plasma glucose ≥ 11.1 mmol/L (200 mg/dL)
A random blood sugar of greater than 11.1 mmol/L (200 mg/dL) in association with typical symptoms or a glycated hemoglobin (HbA1c) of ≥ 48 mmol/mol (≥ 6.5 DCCT %) is another method of diagnosing diabetes. In 2009 an International Expert Committee that included representatives of the American Diabetes Association (ADA), the International Diabetes Federation (IDF), and the European Association for the Study of Diabetes (EASD) recommended that a threshold of ≥ 48 mmol/mol (≥ 6.5 DCCT %) should be used to diagnose diabetes. This recommendation was adopted by the American Diabetes Association in 2010. Positive tests should be repeated unless the person presents with typical symptoms and blood sugars >11.1 mmol/L (>200 mg/dL).

Threshold for diagnosis of diabetes is based on the relationship between results of glucose tolerance tests, fasting glucose or HbA1c and complications such as retinal problems. A fasting or random blood sugar is preferred over the glucose tolerance test, as they are more convenient for people. HbA1c has the advantages that fasting is not required and results are more stable but has the disadvantage that the test is more costly than measurement of blood glucose. It is estimated that 20% of people with diabetes in the United States do not realize that they have the disease.

Type 2 diabetes is characterized by high blood glucose in the context of insulin resistance and relative insulin deficiency. This is in contrast to type 1 diabetes in which there is an absolute insulin deficiency due to destruction of islet cells in the pancreas and gestational diabetes that is a new onset of high blood sugars associated with pregnancy. Type 1 and type 2 diabetes can typically be distinguished based on the presenting circumstances. If the diagnosis is in doubt antibody testing may be useful to confirm type 1 diabetes and C-peptide levels may be useful to confirm type 2 diabetes, with C-peptide levels normal or high in type 2 diabetes, but low in type 1 diabetes.

Screening
Universal screening for diabetes in people without risk factors or symptoms is not recommended. Screening is recommended by the World Health Organization, the United States Preventive Services Task Force (USPSTF), and the American Diabetes Association for high-risk adults.  Risk factors considered by the USPSTF include adults over 35 years old who are overweight or have obesity and adults without symptoms whose blood pressure is greater than 135/80 mmHg. For those whose blood pressure is less, the evidence is insufficient to recommend for or against screening. The American Diabetes Society recommends screening for adults with a body mass index (BMI) over 25. For people of Asian descent, screening is recommended if they have a BMI over 23. Other high risk groups include people with a first degree relative with diabetes; some ethnic groups, including Hispanics, African-Americans, and Native-Americans; a history of gestational diabetes; polycystic ovary syndrome; excess weight; and conditions associated with metabolic syndrome. There is no evidence that screening changes the risk of death and any benefit of screening on adverse effects, incidence of type 2 diabetes, HbA1c or socioeconomic effects are not clear. 

In the UK, NICE guidelines suggest taking action to prevent diabetes for people with a body mass index (BMI) of 30 or more. For people of Black African, African-Caribbean, South Asian and Chinese descent the recommendation to start prevention starts at the BMI of 27,5. A study based on a large sample of people in England suggest even lower BMIs for certain ethnic groups for the start of prevention, for example 24 in South Asian and 21 in Bangladeshi populations.

Prevention

Onset of type 2 diabetes can be delayed or prevented through proper nutrition and regular exercise. Intensive lifestyle measures may reduce the risk by over half. The benefit of exercise occurs regardless of the person's initial weight or subsequent weight loss. High levels of physical activity reduce the risk of diabetes by about 28%. Evidence for the benefit of dietary changes alone, however, is limited, with some evidence for a diet high in green leafy vegetables and some for limiting the intake of sugary drinks. There is an association between higher intake of sugar-sweetened fruit juice and diabetes, but no evidence of an association with 100% fruit juice. A 2019 review found evidence of benefit from dietary fiber.

In those with impaired glucose tolerance, a 2019 systematic review found moderate-quality evidence that Metformin, when compared to diet and exercise or a placebo intervention, appeared to delay or reduce the risk of developing type 2 diabetes. This same review found moderate-quality evidence that when compared to intensive diet and exercise, Metformin did not reduce risk of developing type 2 diabetes, as well as very low-quality evidence that combining Metformin with intensive diet and exercise does not appear to have any effect on risk of developing type 2 diabetes when compared to intensive diet and exercise alone. This systematic review only found one suitable trial comparing Metformin with Sulphonylurea in reducing risk of type 2 diabetes but it did not report any patient-relevant outcomes.

A 2017 review found that, long term, lifestyle changes decreased the risk by 28%, while medication does not reduce risk after withdrawal. While low vitamin D levels are associated with an increased risk of diabetes, correcting the levels by supplementing vitamin D3 does not improve that risk.

Management

Management of type 2 diabetes focuses on lifestyle interventions, lowering other cardiovascular risk factors, and maintaining blood glucose levels in the normal range. Self-monitoring of blood glucose for people with newly diagnosed type 2 diabetes may be used in combination with education, although the benefit of self-monitoring in those not using multi-dose insulin is questionable. In those who do not want to measure blood levels, measuring urine levels may be done. Managing other cardiovascular risk factors, such as hypertension, high cholesterol, and microalbuminuria, improves a person's life expectancy. Decreasing the systolic blood pressure to less than 140 mmHg is associated with a lower risk of death and better outcomes. Intensive blood pressure management (less than 130/80 mmHg) as opposed to standard blood pressure management (less than 140-160 mmHg systolic to 85–100 mmHg diastolic) results in a slight decrease in stroke risk but no effect on overall risk of death.

Intensive blood sugar lowering (HbA1c<6%) as opposed to standard blood sugar lowering (HbA1c of 7–7.9%) does not appear to change mortality. The goal of treatment is typically an HbA1c of 7 to 8% or a fasting glucose of less than 7.2 mmol/L (130 mg/dL); however these goals may be changed after professional clinical consultation, taking into account particular risks of hypoglycemia and life expectancy. Hypoglycemia is associated with adverse outcomes in older people with type 2 diabetes. Despite guidelines recommending that intensive blood sugar control be based on balancing immediate harms with long-term benefits, many people – for example people with a life expectancy of less than nine years who will not benefit, are over-treated.

It is recommended that all people with type 2 diabetes get regular eye examinations. There is moderate evidence suggesting that treating gum disease by scaling and root planing results in an improvement in blood sugar levels for people with diabetes.

Lifestyle

Exercise 
A proper diet and regular exercise are foundations of diabetic care, with one review indicating that a greater amount of exercise improved outcomes. Regular exercise may improve blood sugar control, decrease body fat content, and decrease blood lipid levels.

Diet 
A diabetic diet which includes calorie restriction to promote weight loss is generally recommended. Other recommendations include emphasizing intake of fruits, vegetables, reduced saturated fat and low-fat dairy products, and with a macronutrient intake tailored to the individual, to distribute calories and carbohydrates throughout the day. Several diets may be effective such as the Dietary Approaches to Stop Hypertension (DASH), Mediterranean diet, low-fat diet, or monitored carbohydrate diets such as a low carbohydrate diet. Viscous fiber supplements may be useful in those with diabetes.

Vegetarian diets in general have been related to lower diabetes risk, but do not offer advantages compared with diets which allow moderate amounts of animal products. There is not enough evidence to suggest that cinnamon improves blood sugar levels in people with type 2 diabetes. A 2021 review showed that consumption of tree nuts (walnuts, almonds, and hazelnuts) reduced fasting blood glucose in diabetic people.

Culturally appropriate education may help people with type 2 diabetes control their blood sugar levels for up to 24 months. There is not enough evidence to determine if lifestyle interventions affect mortality in those who already have type 2 diabetes.

, there is insufficient data to recommend nonnutritive sweeteners, which may help reduce caloric intake.

An elevated intake of microbiota-accessible carbohydrates can help reducing the effects of T2D.

A 2022 umbrella review concluded that, red and white meat consumption is associated with an increased risk contrary to dairy products which have a diminished risk.

Stress management 
Although psychological stress is recognized as a risk factor for type 2 diabetes, the effect of stress management interventions on disease progression are not established. A Cochrane review is under way to assess the effects of mindfulness‐based interventions for adults with type 2 diabetes.

Medications

Blood sugar control 

There are several classes of anti-diabetic medications available. Metformin is generally recommended as a first line treatment as there is some evidence that it decreases mortality; however, this conclusion is questioned. Metformin should not be used in those with severe kidney or liver problems.

A second oral agent of another class or insulin may be added if metformin is not sufficient after three months. Other classes of medications include: sulfonylureas, thiazolidinediones, dipeptidyl peptidase-4 inhibitors, SGLT2 inhibitors, and glucagon-like peptide-1 analogs. As of 2015 there was no significant difference between these agents. A 2018 review found that SGLT2 inhibitors and GLP-1 agonists, but not DPP-4 inhibitors, were associated with lower mortality than placebo or no treatment.

Rosiglitazone, a thiazolidinedione, has not been found to improve long-term outcomes even though it improves blood sugar levels. Additionally it is associated with increased rates of heart disease and death.

The effects of Plioglitazone have been compared in a Cochrane systematic review to that of other blood sugar lowering-medicine, including metformin, acarbose, and repaglinide, not showing any benefit in reducing the chance of developing type 2 diabetes in people at risk. It did, however, show reduction of risk of developing type 2 diabetes when compared to a placebo or to no treatment. These results should be interpreted considering that most of the data of the studies included in this review were of low or very-low certainty.

Injections of insulin may either be added to oral medication or used alone. Most people do not initially need insulin. When it is used, a long-acting formulation is typically added at night, with oral medications being continued. Doses are then increased to effect (blood sugar levels being well controlled). When nightly insulin is insufficient, twice daily insulin may achieve better control. The long acting insulins glargine and detemir are equally safe and effective, and do not appear much better than neutral protamine Hagedorn (NPH) insulin, but as they are significantly more expensive, they are not cost effective as of 2010. In those who are pregnant, insulin is generally the treatment of choice.

Blood pressure lowering 
Many international guidelines recommend blood pressure treatment targets that are lower than 140/90 mmHg for people with diabetes. However, there is only limited evidence regarding what the lower targets should be. A 2016 systematic review found potential harm to treating to targets lower than 140 mmHg, and a subsequent review in 2019 found no evidence of additional benefit from blood pressure lowering to between 130–140mmHg, although there was an increased risk of adverse events.

2015 American Diabetes Association recommendations are that people with diabetes and albuminuria should receive an inhibitor of the renin-angiotensin system to reduce the risks of progression to end-stage renal disease, cardiovascular events, and death. There is some evidence that angiotensin converting enzyme inhibitors (ACEIs) are superior to other inhibitors of the renin-angiotensin system such as angiotensin receptor blockers (ARBs), or aliskiren in preventing cardiovascular disease. Although a more recent review found similar effects of ACEIs and ARBs on major cardiovascular and renal outcomes. There is no evidence that combining ACEIs and ARBs provides additional benefits.

Other 
The use of aspirin to prevent cardiovascular disease in diabetes is controversial. Aspirin is recommended in people at high risk of cardiovascular disease, however routine use of aspirin has not been found to improve outcomes in uncomplicated diabetes. 2015 American Diabetes Association recommendations for aspirin use (based on expert consensus or clinical experience) are that low-dose aspirin use is reasonable in adults with diabetes who are at intermediate risk of cardiovascular disease (10-year cardiovascular disease risk, 5–10%).

Vitamin D supplementation to people with type 2 diabetes may improve markers of insulin resistance and HbA1c.

Sharing their electronic health records with people who have type 2 diabetes helps them to reduce their blood sugar levels. It is a way of helping people understand their own health condition and involving them actively in its management.

Surgery
Weight loss surgery in those who are obese is an effective measure to treat diabetes. Many are able to maintain normal blood sugar levels with little or no medication following surgery and long-term mortality is decreased. There however is some short-term mortality risk of less than 1% from the surgery. The body mass index cutoffs for when surgery is appropriate are not yet clear. It is recommended that this option be considered in those who are unable to get both their weight and blood sugar under control.

Epidemiology

The International Diabetes Federation estimates nearly 537 million people lived with diabetes worldwide in 2021, 90–95% of whom have type 2 diabetes. Diabetes is common both in the developed and the developing world. It remains uncommon, however, in the least developed countries.

Women seem to be at a greater risk as do certain ethnic groups, such as South Asians, Pacific Islanders, Latinos, and Native Americans. This may be due to enhanced sensitivity to a Western lifestyle in certain ethnic groups. Traditionally considered a disease of adults, type 2 diabetes is increasingly diagnosed in children in parallel with rising obesity rates. Type 2 diabetes is now diagnosed as frequently as type 1 diabetes in teenagers in the United States.

Rates of diabetes in 1985 were estimated at 30 million, increasing to 135 million in 1995 and 217 million in 2005. This increase is believed to be primarily due to the global population aging, a decrease in exercise, and increasing rates of obesity. The five countries with the greatest number of people with diabetes as of 2000 are India having 31.7 million, China 20.8 million, the United States 17.7 million, Indonesia 8.4 million, and Japan 6.8 million. It is recognized as a global epidemic by the World Health Organization.

History

Diabetes is one of the first diseases described with an Egyptian manuscript from  BCE mentioning "too great emptying of the urine." The first described cases are believed to be of type 1 diabetes. Indian physicians around the same time identified the disease and classified it as madhumeha or honey urine noting that the urine would attract ants. The term "diabetes" or "to pass through"  was first used in 230 BCE by the Greek Apollonius Memphites. The disease was rare during the time of the Roman empire with Galen commenting that he had only seen two cases during his career.

Type 1 and type 2 diabetes were identified as separate conditions for the first time by the Indian physicians Sushruta and Charaka in 400–500 AD with type 1 associated with youth and type 2 with being overweight. Effective treatment was not developed until the early part of the 20th century when the Canadians Frederick Banting and Charles Best discovered insulin in 1921 and 1922. This was followed by the development of the long acting NPH insulin in the 1940s.

In 1916, Elliot Joslin proposed that in people with diabetes, periods of fasting are helpful. Subsequent research has supported this, and weight loss is a first line treatment in type 2 diabetes.

Research 
Researchers developed the Diabetes Severity Score (DISSCO), a tool that might better than the standard blood test at identify if a person's condition is declining. It uses a computer algorithm to analyse data from anonymised electronic patient records and produces a score based on 34 indicators.

References

Works cited

External links 

 IDF Diabetes Atlas 2015
 National Diabetes Information Clearinghouse 
 Centers for Disease Control (Endocrine pathology)
 ADA's Standards of Medical Care in Diabetes 2019

Aging-associated diseases
Diabetes
Medical conditions related to obesity